Melissa Holly Suffield (born 24 December 1992) is a 
former English actress from London, best known for her role in the BBC soap opera EastEnders as Lucy Beale. Her first appearance on the show was 28 October 2004, and her last was on 27 August 2010.

Career
Suffield's first professional acting role was in an episode of the children's series Magic Grandad in March 2003, entitled Toys: in 1953. She was featured in an advertisement for 'Master Storyteller, Magic Grandad', one episode of Agatha Christie's Poirot (Five Little Pigs) and in two episodes of Chitty Chitty Bang Bang. She is a voice for one of the children in the toddler's programme on CBeebies, Boo!, She appeared on The Friday Night Project in February 2005.

EastEnders

Suffield is best known for her appearance in television soap EastEnders, where she played Lucy Beale, daughter of Ian Beale, a long standing character. She also appeared in the spin off series of 2010, EastEnders: E20 as Lucy. Suffield helped raise money for Children in Need in November 2007, by appearing in a special Beatles medley featuring cast from EastEnders and in Children in Need 2008, doing a West End when Melissa appeared in Mary Poppins.

She also appeared in a Motown medley for Children in Need 2009. In May 2010, it was announced that Suffield had been axed from EastEnders, after she allegedly ignored warnings about her "unruly" behaviour. On 14 November 2011, it was announced the character would be returning to EastEnders in January 2012, with Hetti Bywater taking over the role.

Post EastEnders
In August 2009, Suffield took part in a documentary called 16: Too Young To Vote? as part of BBC Three's Adult Season, where she journeys around the United Kingdom to find out whether sixteen year olds should get the right to vote. In September 2009, she reported for the programme on BBC, Watchdog, on the dangers of sunbeds.

She also exposed centres that were not following guidelines by checking peoples ages. She also took part in a celebrity version of Total Wipeout. Suffield has also acted in Casualty. In March 2015, she played the titular role in Norma Jeane, a musical about Marilyn Monroe. In December 2019, it was reported that she had currently acted and directed a pantomime at Swallows Leisure Centre in Sittingbourne.

Personal life
Suffield was born on 24 December 1992 in London, England. She plays the guitar and piano, and has taken ballet lessons since the age of two, and still dances under the Royal Academy of Dance syllabus at the intermediate grade. She attended Hatch End High School. Suffield has four sisters; Jessica, Daisy, Annabelle and Eloise.

Suffield is now married to cruise director Robert Brendan, and the couple had their first child together, a baby boy, in March 2020. They currently live in Queenborough, on the Isle of Sheppey in Kent.

Filmography

Television

Film

Theatre

References

External links
 
 Melissa Suffield at the BBC

1992 births
English soap opera actresses
English child actresses
Actresses from London
English television actresses
Living people
English television presenters